Gray Lady Down is a 1978 American submarine disaster film directed by David Greene and starring Charlton Heston, David Carradine, Stacy Keach, Ned Beatty, Ronny Cox and Rosemary Forsyth, and includes the feature film debut of Christopher Reeve. It is based on David Lavallee's 1971 novel Event 1000.

Plot
Aging, respected Captain Paul Blanchard (Heston) is on his final submarine tour before promotion to command of a submarine squadron (COMSUBRON). Surfaced and returning to port, the submarine, USS Neptune, is struck by a Norwegian freighter en route to New York in heavy fog. A United States Navy rescue force, commanded by Captain Hal Bennett (Keach), arrives on the scene, but Neptune is subsequently rolled by a gravity slide to a greater angle that does not allow the Navy's Deep-submergence rescue vehicle (DSRV) to complete its work. As technical malfunctions increase, the submarine's sections get flooded and men die, crewmen have nervous breakdowns and tensions grow between the commanding officers.

A small experimental submersible, Snark, is brought in to assist with the rescue. Snark is very capable, but run by a U.S. Navy officer misfit, Captain Don Gates (Carradine). The tiny submersible is the only hope for a rescue. Ultimately, the surviving members of the crew are rescued by the DSRV, thanks to Gates sacrificing himself by using the Snark to jam the Neptune in place as another gravity slide begins while the rescue is taking place. Moments later the gravity slide pushes the Neptune and the Snark off the ledge and into the ocean's abyss. The film ends with a somber Blanchard climbing out of the DSRV and being welcomed aboard the rescue ship USS Pigeon by Bennett and his officers.

Cast
Charlton Heston as Captain Paul Blanchard
David Carradine as Captain Don Gates
Stacy Keach as Captain Hal Bennett
Ned Beatty as Mickey
Stephen McHattie as Lieutenant Danny Murphy
Ronny Cox as Commander David Samuelson
Dorian Harewood as Lieutenant Fowler
Rosemary Forsyth as Vickie Blanchard 
Hilly Hicks as HM3 Page
Charles Cioffi as Vice Admiral Michael Barnes
William Jordan as Waters
Jack Rader as Chief Harkness
Michael O'Keefe as RM2 Harris
Charlie Robinson as McAllister
Christopher Reeve as Lieutenant (JG) Phillips
Melendy Britt as Liz Bennett 
Lawrason Driscoll as Lieutenant Bloom 
David Wilson as SK1 Hanson
Robert Symonds as Secretary of Navy
Ted Gehring as Admiral at Pentagon Meeting
Charles Cyphers as Larson
William Bryant as Admiral at Pentagon Meeting
Jeffrey Druce as Neptune Executive Officer
James Davidson as Lt. Commander at SACLANT 
David Clennon as Neptune Crewmember
Michael Cavanaugh as P03 Peña (uncredited)
Bob Harks as Radio Operator (uncredited)
Robert Ito as Jim, Lieutenant at SACLANT (uncredited)
Sandra De Bruin as Irma Barnes (uncredited)
John Stuart West as Submariner (uncredited)

Production
Even though the submarine depicted in the movie is a Skate-class submarine, in the opening credits, footage of the real-life submarine  was filmed specifically for Gray Lady Down, depicting the fictional USS Neptune.  Gray Lady Down also re-used submarine special-effects footage and the large-scale submarine model originally used to portray the fictional submarine USS Tigerfish in the 1968 movie Ice Station Zebra to depict USS Neptune. The US Navy's USS Cayuga (LST-1186) appeared in the film as the fictional USS Nassau. The  and her DSRV were prominently featured in the movie.

See also

A Fall of Moondust, 1961 science fiction novel about vehicle trapped under the lunar surface with similar plot elements

External links

1978 films
1970s disaster films
1978 action films
American action films
American disaster films
1970s English-language films
Films about the United States Navy
Films based on American novels
Films directed by David Greene
Films produced by Walter Mirisch
Films scored by Jerry Fielding
Submarine films
Universal Pictures films
1970s American films